Iolaus lukabas, or  Druce's sapphire, is a butterfly in the family Lycaenidae. The species was first described by Hamilton Herbert Druce in 1890. It is found in the Gambia, Sierra Leone, Ivory Coast, Ghana, Nigeria (south and the Cross River loop) and Cameroon. The habitat consists of gallery forests and dry forest.

The larvae feed on the flowers of Loranthus incanus and Phragmanthera capitata. They are green and resemble the flowers on which they feed.

References

External links

Die Gross-Schmetterlinge der Erde 13: Die Afrikanischen Tagfalter. Plate XIII 67 f
Die Gross-Schmetterlinge der Erde 13: Die Afrikanischen Tagfalter. Plate XIII 68 e as (synonym) julius Staudinger, 1891

Butterflies described in 1890
Iolaus (butterfly)
Butterflies of Africa